La Boheme is a 1923 German silent drama film directed by Gennaro Righelli and starring Maria Jacobini, Elena Lunda, and Walter Janssen. The film's sets were designed by the art director Hans Dreier, Artur Günther and Max Knaake. It premiered in Berlin at the Marmorhaus.

Cast

References

Bibliography
 Marta Mierendorff & Jackie O'Dell. William Dieterle: der Plutarh von Hollywood : mit einer Studie von Jackie O'Dell. Henschel, 1993.

External links

1923 films
1923 drama films
German drama films
Films of the Weimar Republic
German silent feature films
Films directed by Gennaro Righelli
German black-and-white films
Films set in Paris
National Film films
Films based on La bohème
Films set in the 19th century
Silent drama films
1920s German films